Hutton in the Forest is a Grade I listed country house near the village of Skelton in the historic county of Cumberland, which now forms part of the modern county of Cumbria, England. It has belonged to the Fletcher-Vane family, latterly the Barons Inglewood, since 1605.

Hutton-in-the-Forest was originally a medieval stronghold and the Pele tower survives. Succeeding generations have altered and added to the house and both the outside and inside show a wide range of decorative styles from the seventeenth century to the present day. The gallery, a rare feature in the North of England, dates from the 1630s and contains early furniture and portraits. The hall, built in 1680, is dominated by the Cupid Staircase, which leads to a suite of mid-18th century rooms, including the Cupid Room. The drawing room dates from about 1830, the library from 1870, and Lady Darlington's Room is decorated in the Arts and Crafts style.

The Walled Garden, built in the 1730s, houses a large collection of herbaceous plants. The terraces were originally laid out in the 17th century. The woodland walk contains a 17th-century dovecote which unusually still contains the potence, an internal rotatable ladder. The 1st Lord Inglewood added a number of new tree species to the grounds and the tree trail guide now lists seventy within the arboretum.

In a nearby field the small church of St James is located, recorded as far back as 1291 as the Church in the Green Field. The architect Anthony Salvin in Victorian times carried out extensive renovations. A fragment of a Norman Cross is preserved within the church, and many memorials act as reminders of the influence of the Fletchers and Vanes over the centuries.

The house is open to the public on Wednesdays, Thursdays and Sundays from April to October.

See also

Grade I listed buildings in Cumbria
Listed buildings in Skelton, Cumbria

References

External links
 Cumbria County History Trust: Hutton in the Forest (nb: provisional research only – see Talk page)

Hutton in the Forest estate – official website

Houses completed in the 17th century
Country houses in Cumbria
Peel towers in Cumbria
Gothic Revival architecture in Cumbria
Historic house museums in Cumbria
Gardens in Cumbria
Tourist attractions in Cumbria
Vane family
Grade I listed buildings in Cumbria
Inglewood Forest
Skelton, Cumbria